Hilongos Airport , located in the municipality of Hilongos, is one of three airports in the province of Leyte  It is located on the southern side of Leyte Island.

There are no airlines operating at this airport.

References

External links
All about Hilongos

Airports in the Philippines
Buildings and structures in Leyte (province)
Transportation in the Visayas